Nikolai Tikhobrazov (1818–1874) was a Russian painter, known primarily for his history paintings and genre scenes.  He studied at the Academy in St. Petersburg under Karl Bryullov, gaining the title of Academician in his own right in 1852.

Biography
Art education he received, attending classes of the Imperial Academy of Arts (since 1835). The disciple of Karl Bryullov. During his studies, he was awarded a small silver medal (1840), two small silver medals (1841) and one small gold medal (1843). He graduated in 1845, a large gold medal for the work «Christ expels the merchants from the temple».

After the Academy went on a trip abroad. In 1847 he settled in Rome. In 1849 he returned to Russia and since then he lived in St. Petersburg, engaged in creative work and taught drawing. In 1852, for the painting «Woman in Albanian costume sitting at the sewing work») was awarded the title of academician.

In addition to writing pictures, he was engaged in monumental painting - he painted the iconostasis, created wall panels, and decorative paintings for the interior. He received the title of Professor by rank of the Academy of Arts (1859).

In the 1860s, Tikhobazov owned a photographic workshop in St. Petersburg.

He died on December 14 (26), 1874 in Petersburg. He was buried in the Novodevichy cemetery. The artist's paintings are available in the Tretyakov Gallery and the Pushkin State Museum.

Selected paintings

Literary sources
 
 Russian Portrait [sic] of the 18th and 19th century (exhibition catalog). Moscow, 1976.

References

19th-century painters from the Russian Empire
Russian male painters
1818 births
1874 deaths
19th-century painters of historical subjects
19th-century male artists from the Russian Empire